Philippe Lacoue-Labarthe (6 March 1940 – 28 January 2007) was a French philosopher. He was also a literary critic and translator. Lacoue-Labarthe published several influential works with his friend Jean-Luc Nancy.

Lacoue-Labarthe was influenced by and wrote extensively on Martin Heidegger, Jacques Derrida, Jacques Lacan, German Romanticism, Paul Celan, and Gérard Granel. He also translated works by Heidegger, Celan, Friedrich Nietzsche, Friedrich Hölderlin, and Walter Benjamin into French.

Lacoue-Labarthe was a member and president of the Collège international de philosophie.

Work

Collaboration with Jean-Luc Nancy
Lacoue-Labarthe wrote several books and articles in collaboration with Jean-Luc Nancy, a colleague at the Université Marc Bloch in Strasbourg. Early collaborations included Le Titre de la lettre: une lecture de Lacan (1973; trans., The Title of the Letter: A Reading of Lacan) and L'Absolu littéraire: théorie de la littérature du romantisme allemand (1978; trans., The Literary Absolute: The Theory of Literature in German Romanticism).

In 1980 Lacoue-Labarthe and Nancy organized a conference at Cerisy-la-Salle, centered around Derrida's 1968 paper Les fins de l'homme. Following this conference and at Derrida's request, in November 1980 Lacoue-Labarthe and Nancy founded the Centre de recherches philosophiques sur le politique (Centre for Philosophical Research on the Political). The Centre operated for four years, pursuing philosophical rather than empirical approaches to political questions. During that period Lacoue-Labarthe and Nancy produced several important papers, together and separately. Some of these texts appear in Les Fins de l'homme à partir du travail de Jacques Derrida: colloque de Cerisy, 23 juillet-2 août 1980 (1981), Rejouer le politique (1981), La retrait du politique (1983), and Le mythe nazi (1991, revised edition; originally published as Les méchanismes du fascisme, 1981). Many of these texts are gathered in translation in Retreating the Political (1997).

On Martin Heidegger
In 1986 Lacoue-Labarthe published a book on Celan and Heidegger entitled La poésie comme expérience (1986; trans., Poetry as Experience). Lacoue-Labarthe received his doctorat d'état in 1987 with a jury led by Gérard Granel and including Derrida, George Steiner and Jean-François Lyotard. The monograph submitted for that degree was La fiction du politique (1988; trans., Heidegger, Art, and Politics), a study of Heidegger's relation to National Socialism. These works predate the explosion of interest in the political dimensions of Heidegger's thought which followed the publication of a book by Victor Farías.

In Poetry as Experience Lacoue-Labarthe argued that, even though Celan's poetry was deeply informed by Heidegger's philosophy, Celan was long aware of Heidegger's association with the Nazi party and therefore fundamentally circumspect toward the man and transformative in his reception of his work. Celan was nonetheless willing to meet Heidegger. Heidegger was a professed admirer of Celan's writing, although Celan's poetry never received the kind of philosophical attention which Heidegger gave to the work of poets such as Friedrich Hölderlin or Georg Trakl. Celan's poem "Todtnauberg," however, seems to hold out the possibility of a rapprochement between their work. In this respect Heidegger's work was perhaps redeemable for Celan, even if that redemption was not played out in the encounter between the two men.   
 
Lacoue-Labarthe considered that Heidegger's greatest failure was not his involvement in the National Socialist movement but his "silence on the extermination" and his refusal to engage in a thorough deconstruction of Nazism. He also believed, however, that Heidegger's thought offers pathways to a philosophical confrontation with Nazism, pathways which Heidegger failed to follow, but which Lacoue-Labarthe did attempt to pursue.

Theatrical work 
Lacoue-Labarthe was also involved in theatrical productions. Lacoue-Labarthe and Deutsch returned to the Théâtre national de Strasbourg to collaborate on a 1980 production of Euripides' Phoenician Women. Lacoue-Labarthe's translation of Hölderlin's version of Oedipus Rex was staged in Avignon in 1998, with Charles Berling in the title role.

Bibliography

* contents of this book do not correspond exactly to those of the book it otherwise translates

** collects essays from 1979, 1981, and 1983 and others not previously published

See also
List of thinkers influenced by deconstruction

References

1940 births
2007 deaths
Academic staff of the University of Strasbourg
French historians of philosophy
French literary critics
Historians of Nazism
Continental philosophers
Phenomenologists
Deconstruction
20th-century French philosophers
21st-century French philosophers
Heidegger scholars
21st-century French writers
20th-century French translators
21st-century translators
French male writers
Translators of Martin Heidegger
Translators of Friedrich Nietzsche